An academic department is a division of a university or school faculty devoted to a particular academic discipline.  This article covers United States usage at the university level.  In the United Kingdom and other Commonwealth countries, universities tend to use the term faculty; faculties are typically further divided into schools or departments, but not always.

The organization of faculties into departments is not standardized, but most U.S. universities will at least have departments of History, Physics, English (language and literature), Psychology, and so on.  Sometimes divisions are coarser: a liberal arts college which de-emphasizes the sciences may have a single Science department; an engineering university may have one department for Language and Literature (in all languages).  Sometimes divisions may be finer: for example, Harvard University  has separate departments of Organismic and Evolutionary Biology, Molecular and Cellular Biology, and Chemistry and Chemical Biology.  Some disciplines are found in different departments at different institutions: biochemistry may be in biology, in chemistry or in its own department; computer science may be in mathematics, applied mathematics, electrical engineering, or its own department (the usual case nowadays). Typically, "Departments reflect disciplines with the disciplines representing coherent areas of research and scholarship." 

Departments in professional graduate schools will be specialized like the school itself, so a medical school will probably have departments of Anatomy, Pathology, Dermatology, and so on.

"Departments serve as administrative structures." Departments are generally chaired by a member of the department, who may be elected by the faculty of the department, appointed by the dean of the faculty, or assigned by simple rotation among the tenured faculty.  The duties, importance, and power of the department chair vary widely among institutions and even among departments within an institution.

"Programs [in Departments or outwith] reflect how disciplines (or combinations of disciplines) form curriculum to teach their disciplines or combinations/intersections of disciplines." 

Courses belong to programs and are generally given within a department, and often named for the department, e.g. Physics 230: Quantum mechanics.

Undergraduate academic majors or degree programs are generally administered by departments, although there may also be interdisciplinary committees for subjects which touch more than one department.

Graduate students in academic (as opposed to professional) programs are much more closely tied to their departments than undergraduates, and the department, rather than the university, is almost completely responsible for their selection (cf. college admissions) and course of study.

See also
 Academic major
 Chair (Polish academic department)
 List of academic disciplines

References

Department